Nolan Schaefer (born January 15, 1980) is a Canadian professional ice hockey goaltender currently an unrestricted free agent who was last under contract to HC Ambrì-Piotta of the Swiss National League A (NLA).

Playing career
Schaefer began a four-year tenure with Providence College, beginning in 1999–00.  He played in 99 games total with Providence and recorded a school record 2,848 saves. He enjoyed his most successful season as a Friar in 2000–01 when he posted 15 wins, leading PC to the NCAA Tournament and was named to the All-American Second Team.

Following his freshman year with Providence, Schaefer was selected by the San Jose Sharks in fifth round (166th overall) of the 2000 NHL Entry Draft on June 24, 2000. He followed in his brother Peter Schaefer's footsteps and became the second person from Yellow Grass to be drafted and play in the National Hockey League (NHL).

Schaefer signed a contract with San Jose on August 19, 2003, and spent three seasons playing with the Sharks' AHL affiliate Cleveland Barons (The Barons moved to Worcester, Massachusetts and changed the team name to the Sharks in 2006). On August 15, 2005, he was re-signed to a one-year contract as a restricted free agent by San Jose.

Schaefer made his first NHL appearance with the Sharks by being called up to replace the injured Vesa Toskala on October 26, 2005. He played 7 games in total that season, recording 5 wins.  During that stint, Schaefer was the first Sharks goaltender to earn a win in a shootout, which had been implemented in the NHL, beginning that season in 2005–06. Schaefer subsequently bounced back and forth between San Jose and Cleveland serving as the Sharks' third string goaltender.

On February 27, 2007, he was traded to the Pittsburgh Penguins for a 2007 late-round draft pick.  On July 3, 2007, Schaefer signed with the Minnesota Wild as a free agent. After two years with the Wild's minor league affiliate, the Houston Aeros, Nolan signed for Kontinental Hockey League club HC CSKA Moscow on August 5, 2009, for the 2009–10 season.

Schaefer returned to North America the following season, signing a one-year deal with the Boston Bruins on July 5, 2010. He was placed on waivers by Boston on October 11 to make room for Brian McGrattan. He cleared waivers and was assigned to the AHL's Providence Bruins.

On April 2, 2015, Schaefer signed a two-year contract to return to HC Ambrì-Piotta where he spent three previous seasons before playing as a backup with SC Bern in the 2014–15. Upon the beginning of the campaign, Schaefer sought a release from his contract with Ambri due to family reasons on August 3, 2015.

Personal life
Nolan is the younger brother of former NHL player Peter Schaefer, a left winger who played over 500 games in the NHL, split between the Vancouver Canucks, Ottawa Senators and the Boston Bruins.  His younger sister Falin, was a member of the Canadian National Volleyball team. While playing for Providence College, Schaefer was a studio art major and graduated in 2003. Schaefer was also featured as an answer on the January 11, 2006 episode of Jeopardy!: “Nolan Schaefer of Yellow Grass, Sask., and Glenn Olson of Port McNeil, B.C., play this sport for the Cleveland Barons”.

Career statistics

Awards and honours

See also
 List of family relations in the National Hockey League

References

External links

1980 births
HC Ambrì-Piotta players
SC Bern players
Cleveland Barons (2001–2006) players
Canadian expatriate ice hockey players in Russia
Fresno Falcons players
HC CSKA Moscow players
Hershey Bears players
Houston Aeros (1994–2013) players
Living people
Providence Friars men's ice hockey players
Providence Bruins players
San Jose Sharks draft picks
San Jose Sharks players
Wilkes-Barre/Scranton Penguins players
Worcester Sharks players
Canadian ice hockey goaltenders
AHCA Division I men's ice hockey All-Americans